Didier Blanc (born 7 June 1984) is a French ski mountaineer.

Selected results 
 2006:
 7th, World Championship team race (together with Martial Premat)
 2008:
 6th, World Championship team race (together with Patrick Blanc)
 6th (and 5th in the "international men" ranking), Patrouille des Glaciers (together with Tony Sbalbi and Alexandre Pellicier)
 2009:
 5th, European Championship relay race (together with Nicolas Bonnet, Martial Premat and Tony Sbalbi)
 6th, European Championship single race
 7th, European Championship combination ranking
 2010:
 1st, World Championship team race (together with Florent Perrier)
 1st, World Championship combination ranking
 3rd, World Championship single race
 3rd, World Championship relay race (together with Florent Perrier, William Bon Mardion and Grégory Gachet)
 5th, World Championship vertical race
 2011:
 3rd, World Championship relay, together with Xavier Gachet, Yannick Buffet and William Bon Mardion
 3rd, World Championship team race (together with William Bon Mardion)
 4th, World Championship single race
 8th, World Championship vertical, total ranking

Pierra Menta 

 2008: 9th, together with Philippe Blanc
 2009: 4th, together with Tony Sbalbi
 2010: 7th, together with Alexandre Pellicier
 2011: 1st, together with Kílian Jornet Burgada

Trofeo Mezzalama 

 2009: 3rd, together with Tony Sbalbi and Alain Seletto
 2011: 1st, together with Kílian Jornet Burgada and William Bon Mardion

External links 
 Didier Blanc at skimountaineering.org

References 

1984 births
Living people
French male ski mountaineers
World ski mountaineering champions